Origin is the debut studio album by American death metal band Origin. The album has a rawer and less technically proficient sound compared to their more technical later albums. The album was the first death metal album released on a label to incorporate the use of gravity blasts, although the band's original drummer George Fluke used the gravity blast on their 1998 EP A Coming into Existence.

This is the Origin's only album without bassist Mike Flores, and their only album with bassist Doug Williams and singer Mark Manning.

Track listing

Personnel
Origin
Mark Manning – lead vocals
Paul Ryan – guitars, vocals
Jeremy Turner – guitars, vocals
Doug Williams – bass
John Longstreth – drums
Production 
Produced by Chris Wisco
Mastered by Dave Shirk 
Photography by Liz Caldwell 

Origin (band) albums
2000 debut albums
Relapse Records albums